The 2013–14 Talk 'N Text Tropang Texters season was the 24th season of the franchise in the Philippine Basketball Association (PBA).

Key dates
November 3: The 2013 PBA Draft took place in Midtown Atrium, Robinson Place Manila.
February 26: Ali Peek announced his retirement through Twitter.

Draft picks

Roster

Philippine Cup

Eliminations

Standings

Game log

Playoffs

Bracket

Commissioner's Cup

Eliminations

Standings

Game log

Playoffs

Bracket

Governors' Cup

Eliminations

Standings

Bracket

Game log

Transactions

Trades

Pre-season

Recruited imports

References

TNT Tropang Giga seasons
Talk 'N Text